The BYD Tang is a crossover SUV manufactured by BYD Auto, available as an all-electric vehicle, a plug-in hybrid or a conventional ICE vehicle. The vehicle is the second model of BYD's "Dynasty" series passenger vehicles, and gets its name from the Tang dynasty, the most prosperous of all the great Chinese dynasties.

The first-generation BYD Tang was introduced at the 2014 Beijing Auto Show and was available as a plug-in hybrid only. Retail deliveries began in China in June 2015. The Tang was the top selling plug-in electric passenger car in China in 2016, and the world's top selling plug-in hybrid in 2016. Also, the Tang ranked as the world's third best-selling plug-in car that year. Since inception, 101,518 units were sold in China through December 2018.

The second-generation BYD Tang debuted at Auto China in April 2018. That variant went on sale in Europe (in Norway) in 2021.



First generation 

The BYD Tang is a plug-in hybrid crossover utility vehicle (CUV) developed by BYD based on the BYD S6. The Tang was introduced at the 2014 Beijing Auto Show and was produced to at least 2018.

Specifications 

The latter accelerates from 0 to 100 km/h in 4.5 seconds and the entry level in 4.9 seconds. The Tang is fitted with BYD's second generation Dual Mode (DM) system which allows drivers to switch between all-electric mode (EV mode) and hybrid electric mode (HEV mode). This vehicle is an electric version of the BYD S7.

Second generation 

Featuring BYD's new family design language and previewed by the BYD Dynasty concept car in 2017, the second generation BYD Tang with completely redesigned exterior and interior debuted at Auto China in April 2018. The new model line will include purely gasoline powered versions and pure electric versions (Tang EV600 and EV600D) besides plug-in hybrid ones, with powertrains exactly the same as the first generation. The Tang will be also the first vehicle to be exported to Europe, starting with Norway in "late summer" of 2021.

BYD Tang II

BYD Tang II EV

2021 facelift and DM-i 
The Tang DM received a facelift for the 2021 model year alongside the introduction of the DM-i hybrid powertrain. The 2021 model year of the Tang DM and DM-i models both receive the updated front and rear bumper designs. The BYD DM-i powertrain is constructed with a 1.5 liter turbocharged engine powered plug-in hybrid system. The BYD Tang DM-i is equipped with a lithium iron phosphate "blade battery".

The 1.5L turbo engine is specifically built to accommodate the company's DM-i hybrid technology. In order to achieve high thermal efficiency, BYD designed the engine with compression ratio (CR) of 15.5, an increased B/S (Bore to Stroke) ratio, an Atkinson cycle for improved combustion efficiency, an exhaust gas recirculation (EGR) system, and a series of friction-reducing measures.

2022 facelift and DM-p 
The second generation BYD Tang EV received a facelift for the 2022 model year eliminating the grilles to be more inline with the rest of the BYD Dynasty EV lineup. The DM-p was also introduced as a more performance oriented DM variant featuring the 1.5-litre turbo engine hybrid system. The 0–100 km/h acceleration for the DM-p variant is under 4.3 seconds while maintaining the 215 km pure electric range.

Sales 

Retail deliveries of the BYD Tang began in China in June 2015.

A total of 18,375 units were sold in China in 2015, and with 31,405 units delivered in 2016, the Tang listed as the top selling plug-in electric car in China that year. The BYD Tang also ranked as the world's best-selling plug-in hybrid and as the third best-selling plug-in car in 2016. Until December 2016, the BYD Tang ranked as the world's all-time tenth most sold plug-in electric car. Tang sales in China totaled 14,592 units in 2017, and rose to 37,146 in 2018. Cumulative sales since inception totaled 101,518 units in China through December 2018.

See also

 BYD F3DM
 BYD F6DM
 BYD Qin
 Electric car use by country
 Government incentives for plug-in electric vehicles
 History of plug-in hybrids
 List of modern production plug-in electric vehicles

References

External links

 Official website (in Chinese)

Tang
Plug-in hybrid vehicles
Hybrid sport utility vehicles
Partial zero-emissions vehicles
Cars introduced in 2015
Production electric cars